Mguya is a settlement in Kenya's Coast Province.

For the Mpondomise, the Mguya is also a ritual that celebrates authority and fertility, and that reaffirms the heroic status of chiefs as the descendants of men who slew leopards and who brought nourishing rains.

References 

1/94, Hope to Chief Magistrate, Kokstad, January 17, 1879; this pertains to events not specific to the ritual.

Populated places in Coast Province